Stephen Kaplan (born December 1, 1949) is an American former fencer.

Biography
He attended Martin Van Buren High School in Queens, along with Marty Lang, who also became an Olympic fencer.

Kaplan then attended and fenced at New York University, graduating in 1971 with a degree in English. He was an All-American in 1971. In 1996, he was elected to the NYU Athletic Hall of Fame. 

He competed for the New York Fencers Club, and won four US national team sabre titles with the club. Kaplan won a silver medal in team sabre at the 1975 Pan American Games. 

Kaplan competed in the individual and team sabre events at the 1976 Summer Olympics.

He later coached fencing at NYU from 1980-86.

References

External links
 

1949 births
Living people
American male sabre fencers
Olympic fencers of the United States
Fencers at the 1976 Summer Olympics
Sportspeople from New York City
Pan American Games medalists in fencing
Pan American Games silver medalists for the United States
Martin Van Buren High School alumni
Fencers at the 1975 Pan American Games
Medalists at the 1975 Pan American Games